The Volta ao Alentejo (Portuguese) is a road bicycle racing stage race held annually in the Alentejo, Portugal. Since 2005, it has been organised as a 2.1 event on the UCI Europe Tour.

Winners

References

External links

Volta ao Alentejo winners

Cycle races in Portugal
UCI Europe Tour races
Recurring sporting events established in 1983
1983 establishments in Portugal
Spring (season) events in Portugal